Eridge railway station is on the  branch of the Oxted line in southern England and serves a rural district around Eridge in East Sussex. The station is managed by Southern.  

Train services from the station are provided by Southern. Also, heritage services connecting to Groombridge, High Rocks and Tunbridge Wells West are run by the Spa Valley Railway. 
The station has a small car park and there is a pub next to the station called 
the Huntsman.

Services 
National Rail services at Eridge are operated by Southern using  DMUs.

The typical off-peak service in trains per hour is:
 1 tph to  via 
 1 tph to 
 
Services increase to 2 tph in each direction during the peak hours.
 
On Sundays, the northbound service runs as far as Oxted only.

History 
The station was opened by the Brighton, Uckfield and Tunbridge Wells Railway on 3 August 1868.

At the time the station was opened, the village of Eridge Green was owned by the nearby Eridge Park, seat of the Earls of Abergavenny.

The station used to be a junction for services running towards Tonbridge via Tunbridge Wells West (closed 1985) and Cuckoo Line to Eastbourne (via Heathfield and Hailsham) closed 1965.

When the Uckfield line was singled in January 1990 all trains used the former up line and only the former up island platform was used by British Rail.

In June 2021, work began to provide step-free access to both the National Rail platform and the Spa Valley Railway platforms at the station. The work was formally completed on 16th February 2022. 

The Wealden Line Campaign are attempting to re-open the railway between Uckfield and Lewes and Eridge to Tunbridge Wells lines as a part of the National Rail network.

References

External links 

Spa Valley Railway
Wealden Line Campaign

Railway stations in East Sussex
Heritage railway stations in East Sussex
Former London, Brighton and South Coast Railway stations
Railway stations in Great Britain opened in 1868
Railway stations served by Govia Thameslink Railway
Rotherfield